Theodor Steltzer (December 17, 1885, Trittau – October 27, 1967) was a German politician (CDU), former Minister-President of Schleswig-Holstein (1946–1947) and was a member of the Kreisau Circle during World War II, becoming involved while stationed in Occupied Norway as a transportation officer in the Wehrmacht. He was born in Trittau and died in Munich.

See also
Anti-Nazi activity in Norway by Stelzer during World War II

External links
 
 www.fh-lueneburg.de
 Kreisau Initiative Berlin eV (German)

1885 births
1967 deaths
People from Stormarn (district)
Christian Democratic Union of Germany politicians
German resistance members
Ministers-President of Schleswig-Holstein
Grand Crosses with Star and Sash of the Order of Merit of the Federal Republic of Germany